The original 50 cm statuette of the Little Princess (Kiskirálylány) Statue sitting on the railings of the Danube promenade in Budapest, Hungary was created by László Marton (1925–2008) Munkácsy- and Kossuth Prize-winning sculptor in 1972.

The artist was inspired by his eldest daughter born from his first marriage. She often played in the Tabán wearing a princess costume and a crown made out of newspaper by her father, and at home as well, pretending her bathrobes were a mantle. This image prompted her father, the artist in the creation of this little statue.

László Marton writes: "Évike born from my first marriage, at the age of 5, was playing in a little princess costume in the Tabán playground. When I saw it, I immediately had the subject matter. Titled "Little Princess" I sculpted it as well. It was placed in an elegant location on the Danube promenade. Became a symbol of Budapest."

A larger size copy of this statue was placed on the Danube promenade in 1990, and a second copy in Tapolca, the artist's hometown. A copy of the same statue stands in Japan too – donated by the artist – in front of the Tokyo Metropolitan Art Space cultural center's concert hall. The original statuette (1972) is owned by Hungarian National Gallery.

References

Webpage: 
"Memory of my Father", http://www.littleprincessstatue.com

External links
 

1972 sculptures
1972 in Hungary
Statues in Hungary
Culture in Budapest
Tourist attractions in Budapest
Outdoor sculptures in Hungary
Sculptures of children